Thomas Downey High School (TDHS) is a High School in Modesto, California. It is one of the seven high schools in Modesto.
Thomas Downey High is the second oldest high school in the city of Modesto and its doors opened to students in the Fall of 1951. Its mascot is the Knight, but they are sometimes humorously referred to as the "Downey Ducks." The school's current student population is approximately 2,000 in Grades 9 through 12.

The movie American Graffiti, written and directed by Downey graduate George Lucas, is based in Modesto but filmed in Petaluma, California. The school that students in the film attend is called "Dewey High", but is actually Petaluma High School, the architectural twin to Downey High. "Dewey High" is a reference to Downey. The Block "D" Athletic Jackets and school colors in the movie are Royal Blue and White, identical to Downey's school colors.

Downey's yearbook and newspaper have received awards.

The Agriculture Department at Thomas Downey was first created to work the school's early orchards. The orchards have been since cut down, with the department serving as the main welding area for the students of TDHS. Proficient students in welding go on to competitions for the National FFA Organization. If students win competitions, they have a chance to be recognized by superiors in the welding industry. Companies include West-Mark, Caterpillar, and others. Students also raise animals for the Stanislaus County Fair, hoping to gain a profit. The projects range from 3 to 7 months and focus on gardening, animals, and home improvement. Students also have the opportunity to take a floral design class in which students design and sell arrangements.

The school has designated dress-up days during fall and winter homecoming weeks, Unity Week, and Red Ribbon week. A large rally is usually thrown at the beginning of each year for fall homecoming, where dance performances are given and homecoming court nominees play games meant to be somewhat embarrassing, but all in good fun for the spirit of Homecoming Week.

On May 9, 2022, a male student was arrested for bringing a handgun to the school campus.

Sport
In 2006, the Thomas Downey High boys' varsity had a run n' gun type Offense lead by their seniors  Zeph Tyson, Andre Poree, Travis Jacobson and Roderick Stevens. The team finished 1 game out of playoff contention.

In 2008 the Thomas Downey High boys' varsity basketball team was crowned 2008 MMC (Modesto Metro Conference) Champions by beating Modesto High and had an inner league record of 13–2.

On Saturday, February 23, 2008, the Downey Science Bowl Blue Team won the Central Valley Regional Science Bowl Competition. They defeated the other 23 teams from the area.

The Downey High Boys Soccer team has won the MMC (Modesto Metro Conference) in 2008, 2010, and 2011, and had a section final appearance in 2007.

The Downey High Baseball team won the MMC in 2011 for the first time with a league record of 13-2, and overall record of 20-7-1. Blake Smith (class of 2006) currently plays in the Los Angeles Dodgers organization as an outfielder for the Double A Chattanooga Lookouts. Smith was drafted in the second round by the Dodgers in the 2009 MLB draft out of UC Berkeley.

In 2012, The Thomas Downey High Football team won the Modesto Metro Conference for the first time in school history with a record of 6-0-0.  Overall, the team finished 10-2-0, with a victory over State Champions Central Catholic 45-42, and the school's first playoff victory in 25 years—a 41-6 victory over Jesse Bethel High of Vallejo, CA.
 
In 2013, The Thomas Downey High Football team tied for the Modesto Metro Conference title along with Modesto(high school). Overall, the Team finished 7-4-0. Downey's Second consecutive MMC Titile was led by 15 All league Players, Offense: QB PJ Wilson, RB Mario Sanchez, Wide receivers Tristan Best, Josh Lowe, and Mike Falepouno, Offensive linemen Kyler Bourque, Michael Dean Barron, and OL Josh Roy. Defense: DB Jaedon Webb, ILB Josh Baldonado, OLB Sanjay Parmer, OLB Jozeph Camp, DL Ty Nelson, Danny Cota, and Punter Thomas Reynolds.

In 2014, The Thomas Downey High Football team won the Modesto Metro Conference for the third straight year.  Overall, the team finished 10-2-0, with a first-round playoff victory over Antelope High School, 20-19.  In addition, Downey High Cornerback, Jakob Magana was named Sac Joaquin Section defensive player of the year by MaxPreps.  He finished with 14 interceptions for the season which also placed him second in the nation in this category.  And, Downey High Quarterback, P.J. Wilson, was named Sac Joaquin Section 1st Team Quarterback and finished the season with over 2,900 yards passing and nearly 600 yards rushing. The Downey High JV and Downey High Freshmen teams both completed undefeated seasons at 10-0-0.  As a whole, the Downey football program (Varsity, JV, and Frosh) finished a combined 30-2-0.

Singing
Downey is also notable for its strong tradition in choral singing. Downey has five choirs: Concert Choir (mixed ensemble), Madrigals (advanced mixed ensemble), Knightengales (advanced women's ensemble), Knights(men's ensemble), and Gloriana (beginning women's ensemble). The choirs usually perform three concerts each year: Knight Magic in fall, the holiday concert in the winter, and the spring concert in spring. They also perform at various locations throughout the year and especially throughout the holiday season. The choirs also go on an annual choir tour to Southern California in the spring.

Band
For many years, Downey High had one of the most outstanding band programs in the far western United States. Things got started under the direction of the band director and composer, Roger Nixon, who later moved on to Modesto Junior College and then San Francisco State University. He wrote the music for the bicentennial of Modesto in 1970 which was performed by the MJC Concert Band under Dr. Jensen. Ken Farrell built on that foundation a truly excellent band program. By 1974 the Downey band had achieved twenty straight command performances (higher than first place) at various concert band festivals around California. The concert band recorded a record every spring for many years. Mr. Farrell wrote the school hymn and fight song and arranged and wrote music for the concert and marching bands. The marching band and pep band were also very good, and Mr. Farrell created a unique tradition of appointing student pep band directors to rehears the group and purchase music to perform, starting with Dave (Fowler) Johnson in 1969.

The full marching band performed at every home football game and each game performed a different halftime show consisting of several songs with a different formation for each song.  Perfection was expected and achieved by Mr. Ferrell's bands. Daily band practices for several hours would begin 6 weeks before school even began in the fall. So many Downey band students qualified for the California State Honor Band every year that a quota was set at eleven participants. The instrumentalists were critical to the success of the musical plays that were performed every year and to the school orchestra. Several professional and semi-professional musicians graduated from this program including Gary Coates, Ken Nelson, Tony Clemens, Doug Ruby, Joyce Maley, Scott Ferrel and Dave (Fowler) Johnson who attended in the mid 1960s through the early 1970s. Dave (Fowler) Johnson and Wade Muncy are also piano technicians. In 2008 the Downey Concert and Marching Band performed at the Olympics in Beijing, China.

Alumni
 Dan Archer, NFL player
 Brad Brink, Pitcher in MLB for the Philadelphia Phillies and San Francisco Giants
 Tony Graziani, former NFL Quarterback for Atlanta Falcons
 Bill Heath, former Major League Baseball journeyman catcher
 George Lucas, movie director. Famous for American Graffiti and Star Wars
 Joan Mitchell, co-inventor of the JPEG digital image format
 Laci Peterson, Murder Victim
 Suzy Powell, Olympian discus thrower
 Joe Rudi, former 3x Golden Glover in MLB. Oakland A's (World Series Champs), California Angels and the Boston Red Sox
 Blake Smith,  Major League Baseball (MLB) for the Chicago White Sox in 2016
 Ann Veneman, former Secretary of Agriculture for George Bush
 Ron Whitney, Olympian Hurdler

References

High schools in Stanislaus County, California
Education in Modesto, California
Public high schools in California
1951 establishments in California
Educational institutions established in 1951